is a train station located in Kurume, Fukuoka.

Lines
Nishi-Nippon Railroad
Amagi Line

Platforms

Adjacent stations

Surrounding area 
 Hatchojima Police Station
 Kameo Clinic

Railway stations in Fukuoka Prefecture
Railway stations in Japan opened in 1915